Anthony Stiles (born August 12, 1959 in Carstairs, Alberta) is a Canadian retired professional ice hockey player. He played 30 National Hockey League games for the Calgary Flames in the 1983–84 season, recording two goals and seven assists.  Stiles signed as a free agent with the Flames in 1982. He retired in 1990 after spending two seasons in Germany.

Stiles was a member of the fourth place Canadian team at the 1988 Winter Olympics in Calgary.

Career statistics

Regular season and playoffs

International

References

1959 births
Living people
Calgary Canucks players
Calgary Flames players
Canadian ice hockey defencemen
Colorado Flames players
Fredericton Express players
Ice hockey people from Alberta
Ice hockey players at the 1988 Winter Olympics
Olympic ice hockey players of Canada
Michigan Tech Huskies men's ice hockey players
Moncton Golden Flames players
People from Carstairs, Alberta
Undrafted National Hockey League players